Pinos Municipality is one of the 58 municipalities of the Mexican state of Zacatecas. The municipality borders the states of San Luis Potosí, Jalisco, and Guanajuato, The municipal seat is located in the community of Pinos. the largest town in the municipality is Pedregoso.

Demographics
The results of the 2020 Population and Housing Census carried out by the National Institute of Statistics and Geography, result in a total of 72,241 people living in the municipality of Pinos, which are 34,756 men and 37,485 women.

Has a total of 309 localities, the main ones and the number of inhabitants in 2020 are the following:

References

External links

Municipalities of Zacatecas